Maira Valley (in Italian Val Maira or Valle Macra) is a valley in south-west of Piedmont in the Province of Cuneo, Italy.

Etymology
The valley takes its name from the river Maira, a right-hand tributary of the Po which flows through the valley.

Geography
The municipalities of the valley are Busca, Villar San Costanzo, Dronero, Roccabruna, Cartignano, San Damiano Macra, Macra, Celle di Macra, Stroppo, Elva, Canosio, Marmora, Prazzo and Acceglio.

Notable summits
Among the notable summits which surround the valley (all of them belonging to the Cottian Alps) there are:

 Monte Oronaye - 3100 m
 Buc de Nubiera - 3215 m
 Brec de Chambeyron - 3412 m
 Tête de la Frema - 3143 m
 Monte Chersogno - 3026 m
 Pelvo d'Elva - 3064 m
 Rocca la Marchisa - 3072 m
 Monte Maniglia - 3177 m
 Rocca la Meja - 2831 m
 Punta Tempesta - 2679 m
 Monte Birrone - 2131 m

See also
 Cottian Alps

Notes and references

External links

 http://www.valligranaemaira.it/ 

Valleys of Piedmont
Valleys of the Alps
Province of Cuneo